54509 YORP, provisional designation , is an Earth co-orbital asteroid discovered on 3 August 2000 by the Lincoln Laboratory Near-Earth Asteroid Research (LINEAR) Team at Lincoln Laboratory Experimental Test Site in Socorro, New Mexico. Measurements of the rotation rate of this object provided the first observational evidence of the YORP effect, hence the name of the asteroid.  The asteroid's rate of rotation is increasing at the rate of (2.0 ± 0.2) × 10−4 deg/day2 which between 2001 and 2005 caused the asteroid to rotate about 250° further than its spin rate in 2001 would have predicted.  Simulations of the asteroid suggest that it may reach a rotation period of ~20 seconds near the end of its expected lifetime, which has a 75% probability of happening within the next 35 million years.  The simulations also ruled out the possibility that close encounters with the Earth have been the cause of the increased spin rate.

On 2 January 2104, asteroid YORP will pass  from Earth.

Gallery

See also 
 1620 Geographos
 1862 Apollo
 25143 Itokawa

References

Further reading

External links 
 
 
 

054509
054509
054509
Named minor planets
054509
054509
20000803